Amrita Acharia (also spelled Acharya) is a Norwegian actress of NepaleseUkrainian
origins. She is best known for her roles as Irri in the HBO series Game of Thrones and as Dr. Ruby Walker in the ITV series The Good Karma Hospital.

Early life
Acharia was born in Kathmandu, Nepal  1987. Her father is a Nepalese gynaecologist who met her mother, a Ukrainian architect, while he was attending medical school in Kyiv. Acharia grew up in Kathmandu, Ukraine, England and Norway. She spent her first seven years in Nepal, before her father's job took him and his family to England and then, when she was 13, to Tromsø, Norway. 

At the age of 19, having finished high school in Norway, Acharia moved to England seeking a career in acting. She trained at ALRA.

Career
Acharia played the role of Irri, a Dothraki servant of Daenerys Targaryen in the first two seasons of Game of Thrones.  Her character died during the second season. In a scene cut from the broadcast programmes, Irri was strangled by her fellow handmaiden Doreah (played by Roxanne McKee). Acharia suffered from bruising on her neck the following day after encouraging McKee to "go for it" during the scene.

In 2011, Acharia starred in the one-off BBC Christmas show, Lapland. She also made an appearance as a school girl in the biographical film The Devil's Double.

Acharia played the lead in the Norwegian feature film "I Am Yours", a role which landed her a nomination for Best Actress at the Norwegian Amanda Awards. The film was chosen as Norway's foreign-language Academy Awards submission.

In 2016 Acharia appeared in the role as State Prosecutor in the Norwegian TV-series Frikjent. (Acquitted)
 
From 2017 to present she has starred as Dr Ruby Walker in the ITV series The Good Karma Hospital. Acharia plays an NHS junior doctor who, faced with frustration at work and issues in her personal life, responds to an advert to work at a public hospital in the southern Indian state of Kerala (although the show was actually filmed in Sri Lanka rather than India). She was longlisted for the 2019 National Television Awards in the Best Drama Performance category for the role. 

She is the lead in the British psychological thriller Welcome to Curiosity which is supposedly the world's first film to be entirely crowdfunded. The producers raised £200,000 through crowdfunding. It relates four interconnected stories based around a serial killer's escape from prison.

Personal life
Acharia completed the London Marathon in 2016, with a time of 03:46:07.

She is an ambassador for the charity ChoraChori, which works to rescue displaced and trafficked Nepalese children from India. She speaks Ukrainian, Russian, English, and Norwegian. She does not speak Nepali, but stated she is planning to learn it.

Filmography

Film

Television

Theatre credits

Awards and nominations

References

External links

Amrita Acharya Dunne Photos from the London Marathon 2016.

Living people
Nepalese emigrants to Norway
Norwegian people of Nepalese descent
Norwegian people of Ukrainian descent
21st-century Nepalese actresses
21st-century Norwegian actresses
Norwegian television actresses
Norwegian film actresses
Norwegian expatriates in England
Actors from Kathmandu
Bahun
1987 births